Simpsonichthys nigromaculatus is a species of killifish from the family Rivulidae.
It is found in the seasonal canals of the floodplains of the rio da Pratain in the rio Aporé drainage in the upper rio Paraná basin in Brazil. in South America. 

References

nigromaculatus
Taxa named by Wilson José Eduardo Moreira da Costa
Fish described in 2007